is a passenger railway station located in the city of Ebina, Kanagawa Prefecture, Japan, operated by the East Japan Railway Company (JR East).

Lines

Station layout
The station consists of a single island platform connected by a footbridge to a small station building. The station is unattended.

Platforms

History
Shake Station was opened on July 15, 1926 as station on the Sagami Railway. On June 1, 1944, the Sagami Railway was nationalized and merged with the Japan National Railways. Scheduled freight services were discontinued in 1962, as were most passenger operations, with the station used primarily for train maintenance and schedule adjustment. On April 1, 1987, with the dissolution and privatization of the Japan National Railways, the station came under the operation of JR East. Automated turnstiles using the Suica IC card system came into operation from November 2001.

Passenger statistics
In fiscal 2014, the station was used by an average of 2,101 passengers daily (boarding passengers only).

Surrounding area
 Coca-Cola Japan Ebina Factory
 Kanagawa Prefectural Arima High School
 Shake Elementary School

See also
List of railway stations in Japan

References

External links

 JR East station information 

Railway stations in Japan opened in 1931
Railway stations in Kanagawa Prefecture
Sagami Line
Ebina, Kanagawa